Ryūta Arakawa (荒川龍太, Arakawa Ryūta, born 3 August 1994) is a Japanese rower. He competed in the 2020 Summer Olympics.

References

External links
 
 
 

1994 births
Living people
Sportspeople from Yokohama
Rowers at the 2020 Summer Olympics
Japanese male rowers
Olympic rowers of Japan
Asian Games medalists in rowing
Rowers at the 2018 Asian Games
Medalists at the 2018 Asian Games
Asian Games bronze medalists for Japan
Hitotsubashi University alumni
20th-century Japanese people
21st-century Japanese people